Red Eye Records was an independent record label started in 1985 in the rear of the pre-existing record store of the same name in Sydney, Australia. It had two sub-labels Black Eye Records and Third Eye.

Artists

 James Baker Experience
 Beasts of Bourbon
The Bhagavad Guitars
The Clouds
The Cruel Sea
The Crystal Set
Curious (Yellow)
Deniz Tek  
Drop City
Jack Frost
Spencer P. Jones
John Kennedy's Love Gone Wrong

See also
Red Eye Records (store)

References

General

  Note: Archived [on-line] copy has limited functionality.

Specific

External links
 Red Eye Records label discography

Australian independent record labels
Record labels established in 1985
Indie rock record labels
1985 establishments in Australia